Joshua Safran is an American television screenwriter and executive producer.

Education 
Safran attended the Horace Mann School prior to graduating from NYU Tisch with a Bachelor of Fine Arts in playwriting. He has stated he is Jewish.

Career 
Safran was an executive producer and writer on The CW television series Gossip Girl and was the executive producer and showrunner for the second season of the NBC television series Smash. He shared writing credits with director Shana Feste for the screenplay of the 2014 remake of the 1981 film Endless Love.

Safran was the creator, executive producer and showrunner (seasons one and two) of the ABC thriller drama series Quantico. Recently, he was credited as the creator, executive producer and showrunner for the Netflix musical television series Soundtrack.

He is set to create, executive produce and showrun the 2021 sequel series Gossip Girl for HBO Max. Safran is developing an untitled ghost drama for AMC with Annapurna Television.

Personal life
Safran is openly gay.

Filmography

Film

Television
The numbers in directing and writing credits refer to the number of episodes.

References

External links

American television producers
American television writers
American male television writers
LGBT producers
American LGBT screenwriters
Living people
Jewish American screenwriters
Place of birth missing (living people)
Year of birth missing (living people)
Tisch School of the Arts alumni